

This page lists board and card games, wargames, miniatures games, and tabletop role-playing games published in 1990.  For video games, see 1990 in video gaming.

Games released or invented in 1990

Game awards given in 1990
 Spiel des Jahres: Adel Verpflichtet (English name Hoity Toity)
 Deutscher Spiele Preis: Adel Verpflichtet

Significant games-related events in 1990
GMT Games founded.
Wizards of the Coast founded in Renton, Washington.

See also
 1990 in video gaming

Games
Games by year